The 2013 Asian Canoe Slalom Championships were the 8th Asian Canoe Slalom Championships and took place from May 23–26, 2013 in Shuili River, Shuili, Taiwan.

Medal summary

Individual

Team

Medal table

See also
 List of sporting events in Taiwan

References

Results

External links
Japan Canoe Federation

Canoe
Asian Canoe Slalom Championships
Asian Canoeing Championships
International sports competitions hosted by Taiwan